Sos is a village de facto in the Martuni Province of the breakaway Republic of Artsakh, de jure in the Khojavend District of Azerbaijan, in the disputed region of Nagorno-Karabakh. The village has an ethnic Armenian-majority population, and also had an Armenian majority in 1989.

History 

During the Soviet period, the village was a part of the Martuni District of the Nagorno-Karabakh Autonomous Oblast.

Historical heritage sites 
Historical heritage sites in and around the village include Amaras Monastery (established in the 4th century, rebuilt in 1858), the 5th/6th-century St. Lusavorich monastic complex and pilgrimage site, the 19th-century St. George's Church, and the Tevosants spring monument (1902).

Economy and culture 
The population is mainly engaged in agriculture and animal husbandry. As of 2015, the village has a municipal building, a house of culture, a secondary school, a kindergarten, three shops, and a medical centre.

Demographics 
The village had 1,016 inhabitants in 2005, and 1,089 inhabitants in 2015.

Gallery

References

External links 

 
 

Populated places in Martuni Province
Populated places in Khojavend District